Become You is the eighth studio album by American folk rock duo the Indigo Girls. It was released released on March 12, 2002 by Epic Records.

Track listing

These bonus tracks were only available when the album was purchased at Borders Books.

Personnel
Indigo Girls
Amy Ray – vocals, acoustic guitar, mandolin, bouzouki, harmonica
Emily Saliers – vocals, 6 and 12 string acoustic guitars, classical guitar, electric guitar, bouzouki, mandolin

Additional musicians
Carol Isaacs – Hammond B-3, Wurlitzer, piano, accordion, penny whistle, recorder, percussion
Clare Kenny – acoustic and electric bass guitars
Brady Blade – drums and percussion
Michelle Malone – vocals on "Moment of Forgiveness" and "Hope Alone", vocals and harmonica on "Bitterroot"
Dan Higgins – saxophone on "You've Got to Show"
Jerry Hey – string arrangement on "Hope Alone"

References

External links
 

2002 albums
Albums produced by Peter Collins (record producer)
Epic Records albums
Indigo Girls albums